Tarn Taran district is one of the districts in the Majha region of Punjab, India. The main cities are Tarn Taran Sahib, Bhikhiwind, Khadur Sahib and Patti. The City of Tarn Taran Sahib is a holy place for Sikhs.

Tarn Taran district was formed in 2006 out of Amritsar District. The declaration to this effect was made by Captain Amarinder Singh, Chief Minister of Punjab, during the celebrations marking the martyrdom day of Sri Guru Arjan Dev Ji. With this, it became the 19th district of Punjab. It has four tehsils, which are Bhikhiwind, Patti, Khadur Sahib and Tarn Taran Sahib. The District Headquarters is headed by the Deputy Commissioner, along with a Senior Superintendent of Police, Civil Surgeon, district Education Officer, Improvement Trust and a Municipal Council. The district judiciary is headed by the District and Session Judge, aided by  several Additional District and Sessions Judges, the Chief Judicial Magistrate, and other officials.

Demographics

According to the 2011 census Tarn Taran district has a population of 1,119,627, roughly equal to the nation of Cyprus or the US state of Rhode Island. This gives it a ranking of 413th in India (out of a total of 640). Its population growth rate over the decade 2001-2011 was 19.28%. Tarn Taran has a sex ratio of 898 females for every 1000 males, and a literacy rate of 69.4%. Scheduled Castes made up 33.71% of the population.

Politics
Kashmir Singh Sohal from Aam Admi Party is the MLA from Tarn Taran Assembly Constituency. He was elected in 2022 Punjab Legislative Assembly election.

Politics

Transport

Air
There is no commercial airport in the district. The nearest airport is Amritsar International Airport. Direct International flights are available to key cities around the world in the likes of London, Birmingham, Dubai, Singapore, Kuala Lumpur, Doha, Tashkent and Ashgabat. Domestic connections are available to almost every major city of India.

Rail
The rail network provides good connectivity across the district. Amritsar-Khemkaran and Beas-Tarn Taran railway lines pass through Tarn Taran district. Tarn Taran Junction railway station provides cross connectivity between these two lines. A new project of rail line from Patti to Makhu has been approved by railways since 2013 but not started till date due to delay by state government on land acquisition.

Road
The district is well connected through national highways to rest of Punjab state and nationally. Following national highways pass through the district.
 National Highway 54
 National Highway 354
 National Highway 703B
 National Highway 703AA (Shri Guru Nanak Dev Ji Marg).

Towns and villages
 

The villages and towns of Tarn Taran District include:

Bagrian, Tarn Taran
Banwalipur
Bhagwanpura
Bhikhiwind
Chela
Chhichhrewal
Daleke
Darazke
Dibbipura
Dilawalpur
Fatehabad
Goindwal Sahib
Khadur Sahib
Khalra
Khara
Khem Karan
Maniyala Jai Singh Wala
Manochahal kalan
Mari Megha
Mari kamboki
Mohanpura
Mughalwala
Munda Pind 
Naushehra Pannuan
Nawan Pind Daleke
Pahuwind
Palasaur
Patti
Rahal Chahal
Rataul
Rure Asal
Saidpur
Sur Singh
Veeram
Warring Suba Singh

Notable people 

Krishan Kant - Former Vice President of India
Deepak Dhawan - State Committee member of CPI(M), President of Guru Nanak Dev University (AISF), and Prominent writer.
Lala Achint Ram- Noted freedom fighter, Member of the constituent assembly, Later parliamentarian
Jaswant Singh Khalra, Prominent Human Rights activist
Nizam Lohar, 19th century heroic rebel of the Punjab
Mohan Singh Tur, former Jathedar of Akal Takht, Amritsar and Member of Lok Sabha
Satyavati Devi (born 1905) - Noted Freedom fighter
Bir Singh, Punjabi lyricist and singer
Jaskanwar Singh Gill (Jassa Patti), wrestler
Prem Dhillon, Punjabi singer and artist

See also
Tarn Taran (Lok Sabha constituency)

References

http://dsal.uchicago.edu/reference/gazetteer/pager.html?objectid=DS405.1.I34_V05_327.gif

External links 

 Official website
 DISTRICT CENSUS HANDBOOK TARN TARAN - 2011 Census

 
Districts of Punjab, India
2006 establishments in Punjab, India